Barry Richardson (born 22 January 1946 in Albury, New South Wales) is a former Australian rules football player who played in the VFL between 1965 and 1974 for the Richmond Football Club.

A qualified physiotherapist, he also coached Richmond in 1977 and 1978, and served as Club President in 1985.

References
1971 Tiger Year Book - Richmond Football Club
 Hogan P: The Tigers Of Old, Richmond FC, Melbourne 1996
Richmond Football Club - Hall of Fame

External links
 Richmond Football Club Official Site - Player Profile: Barry Richardson (Photo)
 
 

1946 births
Living people
Australian rules footballers from Albury
Richmond Football Club players
Richmond Football Club Premiership players
Richmond Football Club coaches
Australian rules footballers from Victoria (Australia)
People educated at St Patrick's College, Ballarat
Three-time VFL/AFL Premiership players